Wangara is a light industrial suburb of Perth, Western Australia, located within the City of Wanneroo.

Wangara is one of Perth's busiest industrial areas. It is situated roughly 20 km north of the central business district, and is the industrial hub of the north side of Perth. It is also roughly 10 km from Joondalup, Perth's largest satellite city north of the Swan River.
It has a wide range of warehouses and industrial services, and some commercial services such as new and used car dealerships, mechanics, industrial work wear, excavation services, landscaping products, and gas conversion.

Transport
The Transperth operated bus route 389 runs from Wanneroo to Perth, up and down Wanneroo Road. The 355 and 468 also services to Whitfords railway station and down Prindiville Drive, Joondalup Station or Ellenbrook. On the southern end number 376 runs from Whitfords to Mirrabooka via Landsdale.

References

Suburbs of Perth, Western Australia
Suburbs of the City of Wanneroo